Rindschleiden (Luxembourgish: Randschelt) is a village in northwestern Luxembourg.

It is situated in the commune of Wahl and has a population of 0.

It is known as the "smallest locality in Luxembourg", since it is the only village in Luxembourg with no current population.

Gallery

References 

Villages in Luxembourg